Paralacydes minorata is a moth of the family Erebidae. It was described by Emilio Berio in 1935 and is found in Ethiopia, Kenya and Somalia.

References

Spilosomina
Moths described in 1935